Gregory Robert Dolezal (born October 1, 1978) is an American politician who is currently serving as the Georgia State Senator for the 27th district in Cumming, Georgia. Dolezal grew up in Joliet, Illinois. He graduated from North Park University in 2001 with degrees in business administration and communication studies; he had planned to attend law school but instead moved to Atlanta, where he worked at North Point Community Church and began doing video production work for Louie Giglio's Passion Conferences.

He also worked for eleven years as tour manager for Christian musician Chris Tomlin.

Previously, Dolezal served as a member of the Forsyth County Planning Commission, Comprehensive Plan Steering Committee, Impact Fee Committee, and Transportation Plan Steering Committee. After writing an open letter accusing then Commissioner Brian Tam, whom Dolezal would run against in the 2018 primary, of "releasing false and misleading information," the commission voted deny a motion to extend Dolezal's term on the Planning Commission.

Dolezal initially announced his candidacy for state senate on June 5, 2017. The next year, he defeated Democratic challenger Steve Smith in the 2018 elections by a wide margin. He is a conservative and favors funding for building new schools, is against tax increases, and wants to expand county roads.

In February 2019, Georgia Senate majority whip Steve Gooch named Dolezal as deputy whip; Dolezal stated he was "humbled by the trust that Senator Gooch has placed in me." Dolezal also is Vice Chair of the Science and Technology Committee and a member of the Education and Youth Committee, the Health and Human Services Committee, the Government Oversight Committee, and the Reapportionment and Redistricting Committee.

In December 2020, Dolezal signed a petition supporting the right of the Georgia General Assembly to overrule the outcome of democratic elections within the state.

Dolezal is a founder and partner at Forsyth County-based technology company Renewed Vision, which was founded in 2000 and makes live production software called ProPresenter used by megachurches, the International Olympic Committee, Chick-fil-A, and Mercedes-Benz. He is also an owner and board member of Catalyst Nutraceuticals and a founder of Passion City Church.

Elections

Primary and general elections, 2018
In 2018, Dolezal faced two opponents in the Republican primary elections for Georgia State Senate district 27; the other challengers were Bill Fielder and Brian Tam. On May 22, Dolezal won the primary with 59% of the vote.

In the general election in November, Dolezal was challenged by Democratic candidate Steve Smith for Michael Williams' seat, but Dolezal ultimately defeated Smith with over 70% of ballots cast.

Personal life
Greg Dolezal lives in Forsyth County with his wife and four children.

References

Living people
Republican Party Georgia (U.S. state) state senators
North Park University alumni
People from Cumming, Georgia
21st-century American politicians
1978 births